The Västerbotten Regiment, designations I 19, I XIX, I 20 and I 20/Fo 61, was a Swedish Army infantry regiment that traced its origins back to the 16th century. The regiment's soldiers were originally recruited from the province of Västerbotten, where it was later garrisoned. The unit was disbanded as a result of the disarmament policies set forward in the Defence Act of 2000.

History 
The regiment has its origins in fänikor (companies) raised in Västerbotten in the 1550s and 1560s. In 1615, these units—along with fänikor from the nearby provinces of Ångermanland, Medelpad, Hälsingland and Gästrikland—were organised by Gustav II Adolf into Norrlands storregemente, of which seven of the total 24 companies were recruited in Västerbotten. Norrlands storregemente consisted of three field regiments, of which Västerbotten Regiment was one. Sometime around 1624, the grand regiment was permanently split into three smaller regiments, of which Västerbotten Regiment was one.

Västerbotten Regiment was one of the original 20 Swedish infantry regiments mentioned in the Swedish constitution of 1634. The regiment was allotted in 1696. It changed name to Västerbotten Ranger Regiment in 1829, and was split into two corps units of battalion size in 1841, one of them being Västerbotten Ranger Corps, the other being Norrbotten Ranger Corps. The unit was upgraded to regimental size and renamed back to Västerbotten Regiment in 1892. The regiment had its training grounds at various places in Västerbotten, but was eventually garrisoned in Umeå in 1909.

The regiment was given the designation I 19 (19th Infantry Regiment) in a general order in 1816, but that designation was given to Norrbotten Ranger Corps when the unit split, and Västerbotten Ranger Corps was instead given the designation I XIX (XIXth Infantry Regiment, XIX which in the Roman numeral system equals 19). When the unit regained its old name and size in 1892, the designation was changed to I 20 (20th Infantry Regiment).

Campaigns 
The Second Polish War (1600–1629)
The Thirty Years' War (1630–1648)
The Northern Wars (1655–1661)
The Scanian War (1674–1679)
The Great Northern War (1700–1721)
The Hats' Russian War (1741–1743)
The Seven Years' War (1757–1762)
The Gustav III's Russian War (1788–1790)
The Finnish War (1808–1809)
The Campaign against Norway (1814)

Organisation 

1634(?)
Livkompaniet
Överstelöjtnantens kompani
Majorens kompani
Lövångers kompani
Kalix kompani
Bygdeå kompani
Skellefteå kompani
Piteå kompani

1841
Livkompaniet
Skellefteå kompani
Bygdeå kompani
Lövångers kompani

Heraldry and traditions

Colours, standards and guidons
The regiment has presented several colours. On 20 June 1952, the regiment was presented with its last colour by His Majesty King Gustaf VI Adolf in Umeå. It then replaced the 1902 colour. The new one was used as regimental colour until 1 July 2000. The colour is drawn by Sven Sköld. It has not been possible to discover who has manufactured the colour. It was embroidered by hand in insertion technique. Blazon: "On white cloth the provincial badge of Lappland; a red savage with green garlands of birch leaves around head and loins, a yellow club on the right shoulder. On a red border at the upper side of the colour, battle honours (Landskrona 1677, Düna 1701, Kliszów 1702, Fraustadt 1706, Malatitze 1708, Strömstad 1717) in white."

Coat of arms
The coat of the arms of the Västerbotten Regiment (I 20/Fo 61) 1977–1994 and the Lapland Brigade (NB 20) 1994–1997. Blazon: "Argent, the provincial badge of Lapland, a savage gules, garlands of birch leaves vert around head and loins, holding a club or on his right shoulder. The shield surmounted two muskets in saltire or." The coat of arms of the Västerbotten Regiment (I 20/Fo 61) 1994–2000 and the Västerbotten Group since 2000. Blazon: "Argent, the provincial badge of Lapland, a savage gules, gar-lands of birch leaves vert around head and loins, holding a club or on his right shoulder. The shield surmounted two swords in saltire or."

Medals
The medal ribbon is divided in white, red and white moiré.

Heritage
After the regiment was disbanded on 30 June 2000, the colour and the regiment's traditions was passed on to Västerbotten Group. From 1 July 2013, the traditions of the regiment will be kept by the Västerbotten Battalion, included in the Västerbotten Group.

Other
The regiment had several anniversaries, but the 3 February, however, was the one that was celebrated the longest, which commemorated the Battle of Fraustadt. Furthermore, anniversaries were held on 28 June, 4 July, 5 July, 8 July, 9 July, 14 July, 23 August, 31 August and 8 October. These were anniversaries of battles that which the regiment participated in. The 8 October, was the anniversary of the last united Swedish-Finnish army division's dissolution in Umeå in 1809.

Commanding officers
Regimental commander active from 1651 to 2000.

Commanders

1651–1657: Didrik von Cappellen
1658–1662: Günter von Rosenskans
1663–1666: Kristian Urne
1667–1671: Björn Svinhufvud
1673–1676: Jakob Stegman
1676–1683: Evert Horn
1684–1694: Reinhold Johan von Fersen
1702–1710: Anders Lagercrona
1711–1717: Magnus Cronberg
1717–1723: Henrik Magnus von Buddenbrock
1723–1736: Carl Morath
1736–1741: Johan Bernhard Wiedemeijer
1743–1757: Georg Reinhold Palmstruch
1757–1770: Wilhelm Carpelan
1770–1779: Johan August Meijerfeldt
1779–1785: Wilhelm Mauritz Klingspor
1785–1791: Wilhelm Mauritz Pauli
1791–1800: Gustaf Gyllengranat
1800–1804: Otto Wrede
1804–1806: Eberhard von Vegesack
1805–1811: Johan Bergenstråhle
1812–1828: Lars Jacob von Knorring
1828–1837: Carl August von Hedenberg
1845–1850: Georg Gabriel Emil von Troil
1864–1868: Ernst von Vegesack
1874–1883: Anders Eberhard Svedelius
1883–1887: Elof von Boisman
1897–1901: Otto Ewert Mautitz
1901–1902: Carl Conrad Vogel
1902–1907: Johan Oscar Nestor
1907–1915: Gillis Bergenstråhle
1915–1921: Bengt Ribbing
1921–1928: Hugo Ankarcrona
1928–1932: Per Erlandsson
1933–1937: Carl Bennedich
1937–1941: Nils Rosenblad
1941–1947: Olof Sjöberg
1947–1952: Per Axel Holger Stenholm
1952–1952: Magnus Wilhelm af Klinteberg
1952–1959: Carol Bennedich
1959–1964: Åke H:son Söderbom
1964–1970: Allan Johan Magnus Månsson
1970–1971: Karl Iwan Eliseus
1971–1973: Dick Ernst Harald Löfgren
1973–1976: Sven Nils Anders Kruse de Verdier
1976–1981: Senior colonel Dick Ernst Harald Löfgren
1981–1983: Olof Gunnar Dackenberg
1983–1990: Erik Olof Forsgren
1990–1993: Jan Olof Lindström
1993–1999: Anders Kihl
1999–2000: Per-Ove Harry Eriksson

Deputy commanders
1980–1981: Colonel Olof Dackenberg

Names, designations and locations

See also
List of Swedish infantry regiments

Footnotes

References

Notes

Print

Further reading

Infantry regiments of the Swedish Army
Disbanded units and formations of Sweden
Military units and formations established in 1624
Military units and formations disestablished in 1709
Military units and formations established in 1709
Military units and formations disestablished in 2000
Umeå Garrison